Senegal competed at the 2016 Summer Olympics in Rio de Janeiro, from August 5 to 21, 2016. It was the nation's fourteenth consecutive appearance at the Summer Olympics since its debut in 1964.

The Senegalese National Olympic and Sports Committee confirmed a team of 22 athletes, 6 men and 16 women, to compete in seven different sports at the Games. The nation's full roster in Rio de Janeiro was roughly nine athletes smaller than those sent to the London Games and also featured more female athletes than males for the third time in its Summer Olympic history. Women's basketball was the only collective sport in which Senegal had representatives at the Games, returning to the Olympic scene for the first time since 2000.

The Senegalese roster featured four returning Olympians from London 2012; among them were French-born épée fencer Alexandre Bouzaid, hammer thrower Amy Sene, judoka Hortense Diédhiou, who became the nation's first female athlete to compete in four Olympic Games. Meanwhile, freestyle wrestler Isabelle Sambou, who narrowly missed out the nation's first medal in twenty-four years, led the delegation as the most successful athlete of the previous Games and as Senegal's flag bearer in the opening ceremony.

Senegal, however, failed to win its first Olympic medal since the 1988 Summer Olympics in Seoul, where Amadou Dia Bâ obtained the silver in the men's 400 m hurdles.

Athletics

Senegalese athletes have so far achieved qualifying standards in the following athletics events (up to a maximum of 3 athletes in each event):

Track & road events

Field events

Basketball

Women's tournament

Senegal women's basketball team qualified for the Olympics by winning the gold medal and clinching the outright Olympic berth at the AfroBasket Women 2015 in Yaoundé, Cameroon, signifying the nation's return to the sport for the first time since 2000.

Team roster

Group play

Canoeing

Slalom
Senegal has qualified one canoeist in the men's C-1 class by obtaining a top finish and an outright Olympic berth at the 2015 African Canoe Slalom Championships in Sagana, Kenya.

Fencing

Senegal has entered one fencer into the Olympic competition. French-born and 2012 Olympian Alexandre Bouzaid had claimed a spot in the men's épée, as the highest ranking fencer from Africa outside the world's top eight qualified teams in the FIE Adjusted Official Rankings.

Judo

Senegal has qualified one judoka for the women's lightweight category (57 kg) at the Games. Three-time Olympian Hortense Diédhiou earned a continental quota spot from the African region, as the highest-ranked Senegalese judoka outside of direct qualifying position in the IJF World Ranking List of May 30, 2016.

Swimming

Senegal has received a Universality invitation from FINA to send two swimmers (one male and one female) to the Olympics.

Taekwondo

Senegal entered one athlete into the taekwondo competition at the Olympics. Balla Dièye secured a spot in the men's lightweight category (68 kg) by virtue of his top two finish at the 2016 African Qualification Tournament in Agadir, Morocco.

Wrestling

Senegal has qualified two wrestlers for each of the following weight classes into the Olympic competition, as a result of their semifinal triumphs at the 2016 African & Oceania Qualification Tournament.

Men's freestyle

Women's freestyle

References

External links 
 

Nations at the 2016 Summer Olympics
2016
Olympics